Agrela is a civil parish in the municipality of Santo Tirso, Portugal. The population in 2011 was 1,584, in an area of 6.99 km2.

References

Freguesias of Santo Tirso